River Plate took part in the Uruguayan Primera División and Torneo Intermedio.

Transfer Window

Summer 2017

In

Out

Winter 2017

In

Out

Squad

First team squad

Reserve squad

Out on loan

Top Scorers 

Last update on Dec 5, 2017

Disciplinary Record 
Last updated on Dec 5,2017

Primera División

Apertura 2017

League table

Results by round

Matches 

1: Match was suspended due to an aggression on a member of the ticket office personnel  .

Torneo Intermedio (Group B)

Group table

Results by round

Matches

Clausura 2017

League table

Results by round

Matches

Overall

League table

References

River Plate Montevideo seasons
River Plate